The mouse ear swelling test is a toxicological test that aims to mimic human skin reactions to chemicals. It avoids post-mortem examination of tested animals.

References

See also 
 Local lymph node assay
 Draize test
 Freund's Complete Adjuvant

Toxicology
Allergology